The Riyadh city wall was an 18th century earth-structured fortified wall that once encircled the barricaded town of Riyadh in modern-day Saudi Arabia intermittently between 1704 and 1950.

Overview
The early origins of the wall dated back to 18th century during the reign of Riyadh's ruler Daham bin Dawas al-Shaalan and was razed and rebuilt on numerous occasions over the course of time. The wall was renovated for the last time by Ibn Saud soon after the Battle of Riyadh in 1902 before it was finally demolished in 1950 in order to pave the way for the city's expansion. The wall had 9 gates, which were known as darawiz, the plural Arabized form of the Persian word darwazah, meaning gateway.

History

Historical accounts largely credit Riyadh's 18th century ruler Daham bin Dawas al-Shalaan for being the first one to erect a wall around Riyadh in around 1704. After expelling the Ottoman-backed Egyptian forces from Najd and reinstating the Second Saudi State in 1824, Imam Turki al-Saud ordered the reconstruction of Daham's walls. However, after the victory of the Rashidi dynasty in the Battle of Mulayda against the House of Saud in 1891, the new ruler of Najd Ibn Rashid went on to desecrate and destroy much of al-Saud's structures, including the Riyadh wall. After Ibn Saud deposed the Rashidis in 1902 after the Battle of Riyadh, he ordered the rehabilitation of the wall in order to safeguard the city from trespassers and invaders and was demolished nearly four decades later in 1950 when Riyadh underwent modernization and expansion.

Gates
The Riyadh city wall had around 10 gates and 20 watchtowers.

 Al-Thumairi Gate
 Al-Guraiy Gate
 Musada Gate
 Badiah Gate
 Al-Suwailem Gate
 Al-Duhaira Gate (Shamsiyah Gate)
 Dakhna Gate
 Arair Gate
 Al-Suwailem Gate
 Al Muraighib Gate

Settlements and landmarks that fell within the walls
The following were within the walls:

 Al-Duhairah settlement
 Al-Daho settlement
 Al-Ajnab settlement
 Al-Gadimah settlement
 Qasr al-Hukm
 Masmak citadel
 The Grand Mosque
 Mueqilia settlement
 Al-Muqbiriah settlement
 Al-Ghanaiy settlement
 Sharqiya settlement
 Dakhna settlement

References

City wall
City wall
Fortifications in Saudi Arabia
City walls